The 2019 Odisha Legislative Assembly election took place in April 2019, along with the 2019 Indian general election. The term of the assembly elected in 2014 had expired on 24 May 2019.

The incumbent Biju Janata Dal headed by Chief Minister Naveen Patnaik, the Bharatiya Janata Party (BJP), and the Indian National Congress were the major political parties in the election. Four sitting MP's from Biju Janata Dal joined BJP and INC because they were denied the party's ticket.

2019 Indian general election in the 21 constituencies of Odisha and 2019 Odisha Legislative Assembly election was held in the first 4 phases of the 7 scheduled phases of 2019 Indian general election. MR. Surya Narayana patro is the current speaker of Odisha Vidhan sabha while the deputy charge is given to MR. Rajanikant Singh.

Election schedule 
On March 10, the Election Commission of India announced the dates of the election. 2019 Odisha Legislative Assembly election are scheduled to be held simultaneously with 2019 Indian general election in 4 phases: April 11, 18, 23, and 29. The counting of votes will be on May 23.

Elections were cancelled in Patkura Assembly constituency following the death of 83-year-old, six-time MLA and Biju Janata Dal candidate Bed Prakash Agarwalla. Later the Election Commission of India scheduled it on 19 May 2019. The Election Commission of India further decided to extend the completion of the election for 60 days in view of the devastation caused by Cyclone Fani. The poll was done in July 2019.

Partywise election results summary

Results by constituency

* Election in Patkura Assembly constituency is due to be held.*

See also
 2019 elections in India
2019 Indian general election

Notes

References 

State Assembly elections in Odisha
2010s in Odisha
Odisha